Kevin Hamilton may refer to:

 Kevin Hamilton (basketball) (born 1984), American professional basketball player
 Kevin Hamilton (diplomat), Canadian diplomat
 Kevin Hamilton (politician) (born 1938), Australian politician